Rochester by-election may refer to:

 1878 Rochester by-election
 1903 Rochester by-election
 2014 Rochester and Strood by-election